Zozocolco de Hidalgo  is a municipality located in northwest

Geography

The municipality of  Zozocolco  is bordered to the north by Nautla, to the east by Gulf of Mexico, to the south by Juchique de Ferrer and to the west by Misantla.

Agriculture

It produces principally maize, beans and coffee.

Celebrations

Every September, a festival is held to celebrate St Michael, patron of the town, and in December there is a festival held in honor of Our Lady of Guadalupe.

Climate

References

External links 

  Municipal Official webpage
  Municipal Official Information

Municipalities of Veracruz
Pueblos Mágicos